Norton Disney is a small village and civil parish on the western boundary of the North Kesteven district of Lincolnshire, England. The population of the civil parish at the 2011 census was 226. It lies midway between Lincoln and Newark,  to the south-east of the A46.

Norton Disney is the seat of the Disney family, an Anglicised version of the original French surname d'Isigny, of Isigny-sur-Mer, Normandy, from whom film producer Walt Disney's family might be descended.

The Village has one public house, The Green Man, which was formerly the St Vincent Arms.

History
There is a commemorative brass in the medieval church of St Michael commemorating three generations of the d’Isigny or Disney family, made about 1580. In the bottom panel is an inscription reading:
The lyfe, conversacion and Service, of the first above named William Disney and of Richard Disney his sonne were comendable amongest ther Neighbours trewe and fathefull to ther Prince and cuntre & acceptable Thallmighty of whom the truth they are received to Salvation accordinge to the Stedfast faythe which they had in & throughe the mercy and merit of Christ our savior Thees thuthes are thus sett for the that in all ages God maybe thankfully Glorified for thes and suche lyke his gracius benifites.

Two mosaic floors were found when excavating a Roman villa in the parish. The site was near to the Roman town of Brough or Crocoalana, on the Fosse Way, just over the border in Nottinghamshire.

During the Second World War, RAF Station Swinderby (later renamed RAF Station Norton Disney) was home to No 93 Maintenance Unit (No 93 MU) from August 1939 until 1958.

Walt Disney visit
Walt Disney visited the village on the afternoon of Thursday 7 July 1949, in an attempt to trace his ancestry.

After seeing the village, he left for a night at Boroughbridge in North Yorkshire, later visiting 8 Howard Place in Edinburgh on Friday 8 July. He visited Loch Ness. Disney also planned to visit the Derbyshire Peaks, Stratford-upon-Avon, the Scottish Highlands, and Burns country.

His film Treasure Island was being filmed at Denham Film Studios from 4 July 1949, being also filmed at Falmouth and Hartland Quay at Bideford, in Devon, from Monday 4 July 1949 on the Ryelands 158-ton schooner, owned by Plym Shipping Line, for 3 weeks. It was the first film that Disney had made abroad.

References

External links

Villages in Lincolnshire
Civil parishes in Lincolnshire
North Kesteven District
Disney family